The 1995 Tour de Romandie was the 49th edition of the Tour de Romandie cycle race and was held from 2 May to 7 May 1995. The race started in Bernex and finished in Geneva. The race was won by Tony Rominger of the Mapei team.

General classification

References

1995
Tour de Romandie